Asca chilensis is a species of mite in the family Ascidae.

Subspecies
These two subspecies belong to the species Asca chilensis:
 Asca chilensis chilensis
 Asca chilensis panamaensis Karg, 1977

References

Further reading

 

chilensis
Articles created by Qbugbot
Animals described in 1977
Taxa named by Wolfgang Karg